Chris Hunnable (born 19 March 1964) is a British former equestrian. He competed in the individual eventing at the 1996 Summer Olympics.

References

External links
 

1964 births
Living people
British male equestrians
Olympic equestrians of Great Britain
Equestrians at the 1996 Summer Olympics
People from Braintree, Essex